The Red Beans and Rice Bowl is the name of the rivalry between the Central Arkansas Bears and the McNeese Cowboys. The winner of the game receives a bronzed bowl trophy. The name of the game was chosen by the two schools to recognize the importance of the rice industry in Louisiana and Arkansas. The two teams have met thirteen times on the football field, with Central Arkansas leading 7–6.

Game results

See also  
 List of NCAA college football rivalry games

References

College football rivalries in the United States
Central Arkansas Bears football
McNeese Cowboys football